Evans Rusike (born 13 June 1990) is a Zimbabwean footballer who plays as a forward for Premier Soccer League side Supersport United in South Africa. He also plays for the Zimbabwe national team.

Career

Club
Rusike began his career in Zimbabwe with Kiglon in 2010, before moving to Zimbabwe Saints in 2012. Three years later, in 2015, he left his homeland for the first time as he agreed to join South African Premier Soccer League club Maritzburg United. His league debut came on 22 August against Ajax Cape Town. At the end of his first season with Maritzburg, Rusike made a total of 28 appearances in all competitions for the club.

International
Rusike has made two appearances for the Zimbabwe national team, with his debut coming in March 2016 against Swaziland in a 2017 Africa Cup of Nations qualifier. His second cap came three days later against the same opponents in the same competition, a match in which he scored his first goal for Zimbabwe in a 4–0 win.

Career statistics

Club
.

International
.

International goals
. Scores and results list Zimbabwe's goal tally first.

References

External links
 

1990 births
Living people
Zimbabwean footballers
Association football forwards
Kiglon F.C. players
Maritzburg United F.C. players
SuperSport United F.C. players
South African Premier Division players
Zimbabwean expatriate footballers
Expatriate soccer players in South Africa
Zimbabwean expatriate sportspeople in South Africa
2017 Africa Cup of Nations players
2019 Africa Cup of Nations players
Zimbabwe international footballers